Lake Saint Francis may refer to:
Lake Saint Francis (Canada) (Lac Saint-François) on the Saint Lawrence River
Lake Saint Francis in Pennsylvania
Lake Saint Francis in Arkansas